Tonlé Sap (or commonly translated as 'Great Lake'; , chữ Hán: 湖海/壺海) is a lake in the northwest of Cambodia. It belongs to the Mekong River system. It is the largest freshwater lake in Southeast Asia and one of the most diverse and productive ecosystems in the world, designated as a Biosphere Reserve by UNESCO in 1997 due to its high biodiversity. Entering the 21st century, the lake and its surrounding ecosystems are under increasing pressure from deforestation, infrastructure development and climate change.

Geography

Tonlé Sap Lake is located in the northwest of the lower Mekong plain, formed by the collision and collapse of the Indian Plate and the Eurasian Plate. The lower Mekong plain used to be a bay, and the sea level rose rapidly at the end of the last glacial period. The current river morphology of the Mekong Delta was developed over the past 6,000 years, while the remaining waters in the northwest corner of the lower Mekong plain formed the Tonlé Sap.

The -long Tonlé Sap River connects the Tonlé Sap Lake with the Mekong River and contributes 9% of the flow of the Mekong River.

About 34% of the water in the Tonlé Sap comes from the rivers that enter the lake, about 53.5% from the Mekong River, and 12.5% from precipitation. May to October is the rainy season in the lower Mekong plain, and November to March is the dry season. Almost all the precipitation is in the rainy season. As the monsoon rain begins, the water level of the river begins to rise. As the water level continues to rise, the flow of the river reverses.

The extreme hydrodynamic complexity of the Tonlé Sap Lake, both in time and space, makes it impossible to measure specific flow, and water level rather than velocity and volume determines the movement of water as it shapes the landscape. 72% of the modern sediments deposited in the Tonlé Sap come from the Mekong River, while only 28% come from the catchments upstream of the lake. Sediment-bound phosphorus acts as the basis of the food chain through phytoplankton, and internal nutrient cycling plays a crucial role in the productivity of the floodplain and, therefore, the long-term sustainability of the lake's entire ecosystem.

Ecology

The land cover of the Tonlé Sap Lake Basin is 55% of the forest land and 45% of the agricultural land. The lake is surrounded by freshwater mangroves known as "flood forests", accounting for 3% of the basin area, and the floodplain is surrounded by low hills and covered with evergreen or deciduous seasonal tropical The forest is dominated by Dipterocarpaceae, Leguminosae, Lacelandaceae, and in some places Pinaceae, Rohan pineaceae or bamboo. As the distance from the lake becomes farther and farther away, the forest gradually turns into a thicket, and finally into a meadow. In areas with higher quality soils or higher altitudes, deciduous mixed forests and semi-evergreen forests occur. This diversity of vegetation types underlies the species diversity of the Tonle Sap ecosystem, with interlocking forests, grasslands and swamps providing refuge for local wildlife.

The lake is home to at least 149 species of fish, 11 of which are globally endangered, and the lake area is also home to 6 near-threatened species, including spotted-billed pelicans, great bald storks, bengal bustards, black-bellied pelicans, and grey-headed fishing eagles and Far Eastern reed warbler, in addition to supporting reptile populations including the endangered Siamese crocodile and numerous freshwater snakes, and although much of the Lake District has been turned into farmland, 200 species of higher plants are still recorded. The Mekong giant catfish, which lives in the Tonlé Sap Lake, is one of the largest freshwater fish in the world. A fisherman caught a Mekong giant catfish weighing nearly 648 pounds in May 2004, but its population has been declining since the mid-1970s. It is currently illegal for fishermen to catch and retain Mekong giant catfish, and only a few are used for scientific research.

As a natural flood reservoir for the entire Mekong River system, Tonlé Sap Lake regulates floods in the lower reaches of Phnom Penh during the rainy season, and is also an important supplement to the dry season flow of the Mekong Delta. In 1997, UNESCO designated the Tonle Sap as a biosphere reserve, but scientists have been concerned that high dams built in southern China and Laos will affect the strength and flow of countercurrents into the Tonlé Sap, reducing the number of fish in the lake. Tonle Sap habitat for nesting, breeding, spawning, and foraging in the floodplain, which will adversely affect fish productivity and overall biodiversity in the Tonle Sap.

Forest loss hotspots are located in low floodplain areas where protected areas are located, significant farmland expansion is mainly in the intersection between the lower and upper floodplains, population growth, fuelwood gathering and logging are the main causes of forest loss, intensification of agricultural activities and upstream hydropower development reduces buffers to natural habitats and increases the risk of forest loss. By the 2030s, hydropower development may lead to large-scale changes in habitat, with the area of coastal forests likely to decrease by 82%, while the area of rain-fed habitats may increase by 10–13%. In July 2020, under the influence of the El Niño phenomenon and the impoundment of dams in the tributaries of the Mekong River, the water level of the Tonle Sap Lake hit a record low for the same period in the past 60 years.

Fishery

The Tonlé Sap Lake District has always been a vital fishing and agricultural production area for Cambodia, and it has largely maintained Angkor, the largest pre-industrial settlement complex in history. While many fish left lakes and ponds to spawn in flooded forests at the onset of floods, the inflow of Mekong floods brought large numbers of fry, which found shelter and food in flooded forests and floodplains.

The approximately 1.2 million people who live in the Tonlé Sap Lake area, which accounts for about 60% of Cambodia's annual freshwater catch of over 400,000 tons, account for 60% of the country's population's protein intake. Most fish are eaten fresh, and fermented fish paste Prahoc is usually marinated from the least popular fish or leftover fish that cannot be sold fresh. For more than a century, the most productive lake areas have been privatized through a government-lease system of fishing grounds, providing more than $2 million in tax revenue annually.

Since Buddhism is against killing, fishermen tend to limit their catch to what they can feed their families. They do not kill the fish with their own hands but wait for the fish to die naturally after they leave the water. At the end of the rice season, people restore canoes that have been in use for hundreds of years or build new canoes when they can't be repaired in temples along the river, in preparation for the boating competition of the water festival. After two days of racing all the canoes come together to celebrate the Naga, the water serpent, who spit out the lake into the sea at the end of the rainy season, while bringing fish into the Mekong through the Tonlé Sap River.

The area is home to many Cambodians of Vietnamese origin who live in floating villages on boats by the lake. Most of the fishermen of Tonlé Sap Lake are of Vietnamese origin. They have lived in Cambodia for a long time and are the main suppliers of the country's fishery market. They had to flee to Vietnam during the Khmer Rouge era from 1975 to 1979. Only returned after the downfall and continued to fish in the Tonle Sap.

See also

References

Further reading
 Kuenzer, C. (2013): "Field Note: Threatening Tonle Sap: Challenges for Southeast-Asia’s largest Freshwater Lake." In: Pacific Geographies 40, pp. 29–31.
 Milton Osborne, The Mekong, Turbulent Past, Uncertain Future (Atlantic Monthly Press, 2000)

External links

 CPWF-Mekong
 3S Rivers Protection Network
 Australian Mekong Resource Centre
 Cambodia National Mekong Committee
 THE STRATEGIC SIGNIFICANCE OF THE MEKONG By: Osborne, Milton
 Washington Post
 Country Profile
 International Journal of Water Resources Development – Tonle Sap Special Issue
 Tonle Sap Modelling project (WUP-FIN) under Mekong River Commission
 Protected areas in Cambodia

 
Lakes of Cambodia
Rivers of Cambodia
Biosphere reserves of Cambodia
Geography of Phnom Penh
Shrunken lakes
Tributaries of the Mekong River
Freshwater ecoregions